National Highway 319D, commonly referred to as NH 319D is a national highway in India. It is a secondary route of primary National Highway 19.  NH-319D runs in the state of Uttar Pradesh in India.

Route 
NH319D connects Allahabad, Phulpur and Mungra Badshahpur in the state of Uttar Pradesh.

Junctions  
 
  Terminal near Allahabad.
  Terminal near Mungra Badshahpur.

See also 
 List of National Highways in India
 List of National Highways in India by state

References

External links 

 NH 319D on OpenStreetMap

National highways in India
National Highways in Uttar Pradesh